Christopher Male (born 16 June 1972) is an English former footballer who played for Stoke City.

Career
Male joined Stoke City as a teenager from Portsmouth but his only appearance for the club came in a 1–1 draw at home to Northampton Town in the Football League Trophy during the 1990–91 season, where he came on as a substitute for Dave Kevan. He moved back to his home town of Portsmouth at the end of the season and played for Waterlooville.

Career statistics
Source:

References

1972 births
Living people
Footballers from Portsmouth
Association football midfielders
English footballers
Portsmouth F.C. players
Stoke City F.C. players
Waterlooville F.C. players